Fire 98 SC is an American women's soccer club based in Saint Paul, Minnesota. It participates in the WPSL, and was awarded an expansion franchise on February 6, 2018. The club's coaches are Mickey McNeill and Aaron Tilsen.

Current squad

Current staff

References 

Women's Premier Soccer League teams
Soccer clubs in Minnesota
Association football clubs established in 2018
Sports in Saint Paul, Minnesota
2018 establishments in Minnesota